Legislative elections were held in Austria on 29 September 2013 to elect the 25th National Council, the lower house of Austria's bicameral parliament.

The parties of the ruling grand coalition, the Social Democratic Party of Austria (SPÖ) and Austrian People's Party (ÖVP), suffered losses, but placed first and second respectively and retained their combined majority. The Freedom Party of Austria (FPÖ) won 20.5%, an increase of three percentage points, and The Greens achieved their best result up to this point with 12.4% and 24 seats. With the collapse of the Alliance for the Future of Austria (BZÖ), which fell below the 4% electoral threshold and lost all its seats, two new parties entered the National Council: Team Stronach with 5.7% and NEOS – The New Austria with 5.0%.

The election saw considerable change in the composition of the National Council; the ruling grand coalition won its lowest combined share of the popular vote in history. The coalition was nonetheless renewed, and Werner Faymann of the SPÖ remained Chancellor.

Overview 
The government is a grand coalition between Austria's two largest parties, the SPÖ and ÖVP, who rule with the SPÖ's Werner Faymann as Chancellor. Support for both governing parties has fallen marginally since the 2008 election. The Freedom Party (FPÖ) and Alliance for the Future of Austria (BZÖ) made significant gains in the previous election, but while the FPÖ gained support after the 2008 election, the BZÖ shrank after the death of its founder Jörg Haider and taking a turn toward liberalism. Additionally, nine of the BZÖ's 21 elected members to the National Council changed their party affiliation during the term: five members joined the Team Stronach, while four joined the FPÖ. Team Stronach, funded by Austrian-Canadian businessman Frank Stronach, has emerged as an anti-euro alternative and eventually started to hurt the FPÖ's standing in the polls. The Greens have solidified their position as the fourth-largest party in opinion polls.

Contesting parties 
The table below lists parties represented in the 24th National Council.

Qualified parties 
In addition to the parties already represented in the National Council, nine parties collected enough signatures to be placed on the ballot. Four of these were cleared to be on the ballot in all states, five of them only in some.

On the ballot in all 9 states 
 Team Stronach (FRANK)
 NEOS – The New Austria (NEOS - Das Neue Österreich)
 Communist Party of Austria (KPÖ)
 Pirate Party of Austria (PIRAT)

On the ballot in some states only 
 Christian Party of Austria (CPÖ) - on the ballot only in Upper Austria, Styria, Vorarlberg and Burgenland
 The Change (Der Wandel) - on the ballot only in Vienna and Upper Austria
 Socialist Left Party (SLP) - on the ballot only in Vienna
 EU Exit Party (EU-Austrittspartei) - on the ballot only in Vorarlberg
 Men's Party of Austria (Männerpartei Österreichs) - on the ballot only in Vorarlberg

Campaign 
Issues included corruption scandals across the main parties and Austria's relative financial stability facing a probable crisis.

Opinion polling

Recent opinion polls

Older opinion polls

Results

Results by state

Preference votes
Alongside votes for a party, voters were able to cast a preferential votes for a candidate on the party list. The ten candidates with the most preferential votes on a federal level were as follows:

Government formation
The "grand coalition" of SPÖ and ÖVP retained their majority. While the SPÖ were keen to renew the coalition, the ÖVP also considered the possibility of a coalition with the FPÖ and another smaller party. On October 14, the SPÖ and the ÖVP agreed to start coalition talks with each other, and on December 16, the second Faymann cabinet was formed by the SPÖ and the ÖVP.

See also

 Grand coalition (Germany)

References

External links 
 Social Democratic Party of Austria
 Austrian People's Party
 Freedom Party of Austria
 The Greens – The Green Alternative
 Alliance for the Future of Austria
 Team Stronach
 Christian Party of Austria
 Communist Party of Austria
 EU Withdrawal Party
 Men's Party of Austria
 NEOS – The New Austria
 Pirate Party of Austria
 Socialist Left Party
 The Change

Elections in Austria
Austria
Legislative
Austria